Lukose Leelamma is an Indian athlete. She won a silver medal in 10000 metres in the 1991 Asian Athletics Championships. She was the National champion in 10000 metres in 1992, 1993, and 1994 and 3000 metres in 1991.

References

Living people
Year of birth missing (living people)
Indian female long-distance runners
Indian female marathon runners